Rechevo is a rural locality (a village) in Pokrovskoye Rural Settlement, Vashkinsky District, Vologda Oblast, Russia. The population was 1 as of 2002.

Geography 
Rechevo is located 75 km northwest of Lipin Bor (the district's administrative centre) by road. Timoshino is the nearest rural locality.

References 

Rural localities in Vashkinsky District